Robert Edric (born 14 April 1956) is the pseudonym of Gary Edric Armitage, a British novelist born in Sheffield. Nick Rennison has suggested that Edric might be "the finest and most adventurous writer of historical fiction of his generation".

His trilogy of detective novels, Cradle Song, Siren Song, and Swan Song, also known as the "Song Cycle," are set in the city of Hull.

Works
 Winter Garden (1985) – winner, 1985 James Tait Black Award
 A New Ice Age (1986) – runner up, 1986 Guardian Fiction Award
 A Lunar Eclipse (1989)
 In The Days of the American Museum (1990)
 The Broken Lands (1992)
 Hallowed Ground (1993)
 The Earth Made of Glass (1994)
 Elysium (1995)
 In Desolate Heaven (1997)
 The Sword Cabinet (1999)
 The Book of the Heathen (2000)
 Peacetime (2002) – long listed, 2002 Man Booker Prize
 Cradle Song (2003)
 Siren Song (2004)
 Swan Song (2005)
 The Mermaids (2006)
 Gathering the Water (2006) – long listed, 2006 Man Booker Prize
 The Kingdom of Ashes (2007)
 In Zodiac Light (2008)
 Salvage (2010)
 The Lives of the Savages (2010)
 The London Satyr (2011)
 The Devil's Beat (2012)
 The Monster's Lament (2013)
 Sanctuary (2014)
 Field Service (2015)
 The Wrack Line (2016)
 Mercury Falling (2018)

References

External links
 Telegraph Arts article, July 2003
 Guardian article, History's half-light, June 2006
 Guardian article, My Own Worst Enemy by Robert Edric review – immersive account of a 60s Sheffield boyhood, February 2022
 Robert Edric Archive, University of East Anglia

1956 births
Living people
20th-century English novelists
21st-century English novelists
James Tait Black Memorial Prize recipients
English male novelists
20th-century English male writers
21st-century English male writers